The Distance Is So Big is the third studio album from American band Lemuria. It was released in June 2013 under Bridge 9 Records.

Track list

References

2013 albums
Bridge 9 Records albums
Albums recorded at Watchmen Recording Studios